The 2nd Central Committee of the Communist Party of Cuba (CPC) was elected at the 2nd CPC Congress in 1980.

Members

Alternates

References

2nd Central Committee of the Communist Party of Cuba
1980 establishments in Cuba
1986 disestablishments in Cuba